The 2015–16 Honduran Liga Nacional season was the 50th Honduran Liga Nacional edition, since its establishment in 1965.  For this season, the system format remained the same as the previous season.  The tournament began on 31 July 2015 and ended on 22 May 2016.

2015–16 teams

A total of 10 teams will contest the tournament, including 9 sides from the 2014–15 season plus Juticalpa F.C., promoted from the 2014–15 Liga de Ascenso.

Managerial changes

Apertura
The Apertura tournament is the first half of the 2015–16 season.  It began on 1 August with a 1–0 C.D. Victoria's win over Platense F.C. at Estadio Nilmo Edwards.  Juticalpa F.C.'s first ever Liga Nacional game occurred on 9 August with great success for the debs as they managed to beat Real C.D. España with a 2–0 score.  This game also served as the first ever official game at recently opened stadium Juan Ramón Brevé Vargas.  On 30 August, C.D.S. Vida defeated Club Deportivo Olimpia with a 2–3 away score for the first time after 21 years at Estadio Tiburcio Carías Andino.  That Olimpia's defeat represented their first time losing three consecutive games playing in Tegucigalpa since 2001 and their worst season start ever with a 1–0–4 record at the moment.  On 7 September, Juticalpa's Roger Espinoza became the first coach to be sacked due to poor results.  On 12 September, Vida's defender Elder Torres broke an all-time record against C.D. Motagua for being sent off after only 8 seconds of kickoff in a match played at Tegucigalpa.  That same night, Olimpia's coach Héctor Vargas reached his 400 game as a manager in the Honduran Liga Nacional since his debut in 1998.  On 26 September, manager Ramón Maradiaga coached his last game with Vida leading his team in a 2–0 victory over C.D. Real Sociedad as he was hired by the El Salvador national football team on their quest to the 2018 FIFA World Cup.  On 4 October, Malian defender Mamadou Traoré became the first African player to score a goal in the history of the league in the Platense's 2–1 win over Vida.  On 7 October,  Marathón's president Yankel Rosenthal was arrested in Miami after the United States Department of Justice released a statement saying that he, as well as his uncle Jaime Rosenthal and cousin Yani Rosenthal were labeled "specially designated narcotics traffickers" under the Kingpin Act.  On 6 November, C.D. Honduras Progreso clinched their first ever regular season title after defeating 1–0 Marathón at Estadio Humberto Micheletti.  On 14 November, Motagua defeated Real España 7–1 at Tegucigalpa setting a record as the largest victory against them; representing also, the worst regular season finish for Real España with only 15 points of 54 possible (27.78%).  On 10 December, international midfielder and Olimpia player Arnold Peralta was shot dead by a gunman in La Ceiba, five days after playing his last game in the semifinals.  On 19 December, Honduras Progreso lifted their first league title after defeating Motagua on penalty shootouts after a 4–4 aggregate.

Regular season

Standings

Results
 As of 19 November 2015

Postseason

Playoffs

Semifinals

Final

Clausura
The Clausura tournament is the second half of the 2015–16 season.  The tournament started on 9 January 2016 at Estadio Yankel Rosenthal in the 1–2 C.D. Honduras Progreso's away victory over C.D. Marathón.  This Honduras Progreso's win marks their fourth consecutive victory playing in their season's inaugural game, a flawless record since their promotion in 2014.  For their second year in a row, Club Deportivo Olimpia launched an exclusive yellow jersey which will be used in the month of February to show their support to the fight against Childhood cancer.  On 16 February, all-time C.D.S. Vida's top scorer Carlos Alvarado died at the age of 65.  On the night of 6 April, there were two records accomplished by two players; Javier Portillo became the player with the most red cards in the league with 14 in total.  Meanwhile, Leonardo Isaula played its 502nd match in the history of the league, breaking the previous mark left by Rony Morales who had 501 appearances.  On 10 April, C.D. Victoria consummated their relegation to Liga de Ascenso after Real C.D. España defeated Marathón on week 14; it was the first relegation for Victoria since 2003.  The season ended on 22 May 2016 as Olimpia conquered its 30th national title after defeating C.D. Real Sociedad in the finals with a 5–2 aggregated score.

Regular season

Standings

Results
 As of 1 May 2016

Postseason

Playoffs

Semifinals

Final

Top goalscorers
 As of 22 May 2016
 25 goals:
  Marco Vega (Real Sociedad)

 18 goals:
  Alberth Elis (Olimpia)

 17 goals:
  Claudio Cardozo (Real España)

 15 goals:
  Israel Silva (Motagua)

 14 goals:

  Ángel Tejeda (Honduras Progreso)
  Rony Flores (Platense / Juticalpa)

 13 goals:
  Lucas Gómez (Motagua)

 11 goals:

  Diego Reyes (Marathón)
  Eddie Hernández (Motagua)
  José Tobías (Real Sociedad)

 10 goals:

  Franco Güity (Vida)
  Erick Andino (Motagua)
  Carlo Costly (Olimpia)

 9 goals:

  Frédixon Elvir (Honduras Progreso)
  Romell Quioto (Olimpia)

 8 goals:

  Santiago Vergara (Motagua)
  Víctor Ortiz (Victoria)

 7 goals:

  Javier Estupiñán (Olimpia)
  Christian Altamirano (Real Sociedad)
  Jhow Benavídez (Real España)
  Rony Martínez (Real Sociedad)
  Jesús Canales (Vida)

 6 goals:

  Michaell Chirinos (Olimpia)
  Jairo Puerto (Marathón)
  Franklyn Morales (Honduras Progreso)
  Jerry Palacios (Real Sociedad)
  Julio de León (Platense)

 5 goals:

  Ever Alvarado (Olimpia)
  Carlos Lanza (Juticalpa)
  Iván López (Real España)
  Bryan Moya (Vida)
  Bryan Acosta (Real España)
  Kevin López (Motagua)
  Pedro Mencía (Honduras Progreso)

 4 goals:

  Mario Berríos (Marathón)
  Esdras Padilla (Juticalpa)
  Bayron Méndez (Olimpia)
  Luis Lobo (Platense)
  Josimar Moreira (Marathón)
  Mario Abadía (Platense / Victoria)
  Jorge Zaldívar (Honduras Progreso)
  Juan Mejía (Real España / Juticalpa)
  Douglas Caetano (Juticalpa)
  Henry Martínez (Real Sociedad)
  Mamadou Traoré (Platense)
  Erick Bernárdez (Juticalpa)
  Walter Martínez (Marathón)
  Javier Portillo (Juticalpa / Real España)
  Óscar Salas (Olimpia)

 3 goals:

  Allan Lalín (Platense)
  Edwin León (Honduras Progreso)
  Kemsie Abbott (Real Sociedad)
  Reinieri Mayorquín (Motagua)
  Carlos Mejía (Olimpia)
  Christian Gutiérrez (Real España)
  Gerson Rodas (Real España)
  José Arévalo (Vida / Real España)
  Juan Ocampo (Juticalpa)
  Miguel Castillo (Victoria)
  Nery Medina (Victoria)
  Roger Rojas (Olimpia)
  Wilmer Crisanto (Motagua)
  Kevin Álvarez (Olimpia)
  Sendel Cruz (Juticalpa)
  Luciano Ursino (Real España)
  Pastor Martínez (Honduras Progreso)
  Maycol Montero (Vida)
  Juan Montes (Motagua)
  Samuel Córdova (Marathón)
  Edder Delgado (Real España)
  William Zapata (Marathón)

 2 goals:

  Ramón Núñez (Real España)
  Ian Osorio (Platense)
  Carlos Sánchez (Honduras Progreso)
  Omar Elvir (Motagua)
  Carlos Bernárdez (Victoria)
  Mariano Acevedo (Honduras Progreso)
  Bryan Ramírez (Juticalpa)
  Juan Munguía (Real Sociedad)
  Marlon Mancías (Victoria)
  José García (Juticalpa)
  Aldo Oviedo (Juticalpa)
  José Güity (Vida)
  Randy Diamond (Victoria / Juticalpa)
  Alexander López (Olimpia)
  Dederick Cálix (Honduras Progreso)
  Darvis Argueta (Marathón)
  Henry Bermúdez (Vida)
  Alexander Aguilar (Platense)
  Porciano Ávila (Victoria)
  Juan Delgado (Honduras Progreso)

 1 goal:

  Luis Berríos (Marathón)
  Harlinton Gutiérrez (Real España)
  Bryan Johnson (Olimpia)
  Osman Melgares (Real Sociedad)
  Carlos Palacios (Marathón)
  Enuar Salgado (Real Sociedad)
  Fábio de Souza (Olimpia)
  Julián Fernández (Real España)
  Foslyn Grant (Motagua)
  José Fonseca (Olimpia)
  Hilder Colón (Real Sociedad)
  Mariano Lutzky (Vida)
  Sergio Mendoza (Juticalpa)
  Getsel Montes (Platense)
  Irvin Reyna (Motagua)
  Robert Campaz (Platense)
  Dennis Castillo (Victoria)
  Éder Munive (Marathón)
  Darwin Mejía (Vida)
  Elkin González (Real Sociedad)
  Johnny Palacios (Olimpia)
  Bryan Martínez (Victoria)
  Shalton González (Real Sociedad)
  Arnold Peralta (Olimpia)
  Félix Crisanto (Motagua)
  Orvin Paz (Juticalpa)
  Marlon Peña (Juticalpa)
  Kevin Maradiaga (Vida)
  Allan Banegas (Marathón)
  Franco Tisera (Victoria)
  David Carranza (Real Sociedad)
  Mayron Flores (Olimpia)
  German Mejía (Olimpia)
  Luis Castro (Platense)
  Pablo Álvarez (Real España)
  Raúl Santos (Vida)
  Robbie Matute (Real Sociedad)
  Norberto García (Vida)
  Leonardo Isaula (Honduras Progreso)
  Marcelo Pereira (Motagua)
  Devron García (Victoria)
  Román Castillo (Motagua)
  Marvin Bernárdez (Vida)
  Darixon Vuelto (Victoria)
  David Mendoza (Platense)
  Nissi Sauceda (Victoria)
  Román Valencia (Real España)
  Cholby Martínez (Vida)
  Richard Rodríguez (Platense)
  Georgie Welcome (Marathón)
  Rembrandt Flores (Olimpia)
  Roby Norales (Platense)
  Víctor Berríos (Marathón)
  Júnior Lacayo (Victoria)
  Joshua Vargas (Marathón)
  Darwin Arita (Real España)

 1 own goal:

  Juan Montes (Motagua)
  Cholby Martínez (Vida)
  Marcelo Pereira (Motagua)
  Henry Figueroa (Motagua)
  Mauricio Sabillón (Marathón)
  Carlos Solórzano (Real Sociedad)

 2 own goals:
  Wilfredo Barahona (Real España)

Aggregate table
Relegation is determined by the aggregated table of both Apertura and Clausura tournaments.  On 10 April 2016, C.D. Victoria officially became the team relegated to Liga de Ascenso.

References

External links
 LNP Official

Liga Nacional de Fútbol Profesional de Honduras seasons
Liga Nacional